HD 174500, also designated as HR 7097 or rarely 34 G. Telescopii, is a solitary white-hued star located in the southern constellation Telescopium. It has an apparent magnitude of 6.16, placing it near the limit for naked eye visibility. At its current distance, HD 174500's brightness is diminished by 0.39 magnitudes due to interstellar dust. It has an absolute magnitude of −0.82.

HD 174500 has a stellar classification of A1 IV/V, indicating that it is an evolved A-type star with the blended luminosity class of a subgiant and a main sequence star. At the age of 370 million years HD 174500 is currently on the subgiant track  and is 1.8% past its main sequence lifetime. It has a solar metallicity with [Fe/H] = +0.02.

This object is located close to the 5th magnitude star HD 174387. However, they do not form a double star.

References

A-type main-sequence stars
A-type subgiants
Telescopium (constellation)
Telescopii, 34
CD-46 12676
174500
092669
7097